Mokhovatka is a rural locality (a village) in Novozhivotinnovskoye Rural Settlement, Ramonsky District, Voronezh Oblast, Russia. The population was 167 as of 2010. There are 6 streets.

Geography 
Mokhovatka is located 18 km southwest of Ramon (the district's administrative centre) by road. Novozhivotinnoye is the nearest rural locality.

References 

Rural localities in Ramonsky District